Kim Ji-sook (born 1 April 1967) is a South Korean former taekwondo practitioner. She won the silver medal at the 1988 Summer Olympics, where taekwondo was a demonstration sport, in the welterweight event. At the Asian Taekwondo Championships she became Asian Champion in 1988.

References

External links
 

1967 births
Living people
South Korean female taekwondo practitioners
Place of birth missing (living people)
Olympic taekwondo practitioners of South Korea
taekwondo practitioners at the 1988 Summer Olympics
World Taekwondo Championships medalists
20th-century South Korean women